In mathematics, an automorphic number (sometimes referred to as a circular number) is a natural number in a given number base  whose square "ends" in the same digits as the number itself.

Definition and properties

 
 
  
  
Thus, the automorphic numbers in base 10 are 0, 1, 5, 6, 25, 76, 376, 625, 9376, 90625, 109376, 890625, 2890625, 7109376, 12890625, 87109376, 212890625, 787109376, 1787109376, 8212890625, 18212890625, 81787109376, 918212890625, 9918212890625, 40081787109376, 59918212890625, ... .

These solutions are called trivial automorphic numbers. As a result, nontrivial automorphic numbers, those other than 0 and 1, only exist when the base  has at least two distinct prime factors.

Automorphic numbers in base b
All -adic numbers are represented in base , using A−Z to represent digit values 10 to 35.

Extensions
Automorphic numbers can be extended to any such polynomial function of degree   with b-adic coefficients . These generalised automorphic numbers form a tree.

a-automorphic numbers
An -automorphic number occurs when the polynomial function is  

 
 
so the 2-automorphic numbers in base 10 are 0, 8, 88, 688, 4688...

Trimorphic numbers
All automorphic numbers are trimorphic. The terms circular and spherical were formerly used for the slightly different case of a number whose powers all have the same last digit as the number itself.

For base , the trimorphic numbers are:
0, 1, 4, 5, 6, 9, 24, 25, 49, 51, 75, 76, 99, 125, 249, 251, 375, 376, 499, 501, 624, 625, 749, 751, 875, 999, 1249, 3751, 4375, 4999, 5001, 5625, 6249, 8751, 9375, 9376, 9999, ... 

For base , the trimorphic numbers are: 
0, 1, 3, 4, 5, 7, 8, 9, B, 15, 47, 53, 54, 5B, 61, 68, 69, 75, A7, B3, BB, 115, 253, 368, 369, 4A7, 5BB, 601, 715, 853, 854, 969, AA7, BBB, 14A7, 2369, 3853, 3854, 4715, 5BBB, 6001, 74A7, 8368, 8369, 9853, A715, BBBB, ...

Programming example
def hensels_lemma(polynomial_function, base: int, power: int):
    """Hensel's lemma."""
    if power == 0:
        return [0]
    if power > 0:
        roots = hensels_lemma(polynomial_function, base, power - 1)
    new_roots = []
    for root in roots:
        for i in range(0, base):
            new_i = i * base ** (power - 1) + root
            new_root = polynomial_function(new_i) % pow(base, power)
            if new_root == 0:
                new_roots.append(new_i)
    return new_roots

base = 10
digits = 10

def automorphic_polynomial(x):
    return x ** 2 - x

for i in range(1, digits + 1):
    print(hensels_lemma(automorphic_polynomial, base, i))

See also
 Arithmetic dynamics
 Kaprekar number
 P-adic number
 P-adic analysis
 Zero divisor

References

External links 

Arithmetic dynamics
Base-dependent integer sequences
Mathematical analysis
Modular arithmetic
Number theory
P-adic numbers
Ring theory